American Weed is a documentary series about the U.S. state of Colorado's medical cannabis industry, which premiered on the American television network National Geographic on February 22, 2012.

References

External links
 
 

2012 in American television
American television series about cannabis
National Geographic (American TV channel) original programming